Frank Breyfogle Laporte (February 6, 1880 – September 25, 1939) was an American baseball player.

Biography

Born in Uhrichsville, Ohio, he began his major league career with the New York Highlanders (present day New York Yankees) in 1905.  He was eventually traded to the St. Louis Browns, where he had his best years.  In  he batted a career-high .314.  In  LaPorte went to the Indianapolis Hoosiers of the Federal League. He led the league with 107 RBIs in 1914 while batting .311 for the first-place Indianapolis Hoosiers in 1914. His last game was on 10/03/1915. After his  season, he retired.

In 1194 games over 11 seasons, LaPorte posted a .281 batting average (1185-for-4212) with 501 runs, 198 doubles, 78 triples, 16 home runs, 560 RBI, 101 stolen bases, 288 bases on balls, .331 on-base percentage and .377 slugging percentage. He finished his career with a .944 fielding percentage playing at first, second and third base and all three outfield positions.

LaPorte died on September 25, 1939 in Newcomerstown, Ohio. He was buried in Union Cemetery in Uhrichsville, Ohio.

See also
List of Major League Baseball annual runs batted in leaders

External links

1880 births
1939 deaths
Baseball players from Ohio
Major League Baseball second basemen
New York Highlanders players
Boston Red Sox players
St. Louis Browns players
Washington Senators (1901–1960) players
Buffalo Bisons (minor league) players
Indianapolis Hoosiers players
Newark Peppers players
People from Uhrichsville, Ohio